Molodova is a village (selo) of Ukraine, in Vovchansk Raion, Kharkiv Oblast. It has a population of 595.

History 

During the Holodomor, 122 people died in the village.

2022 Russian invasion of Ukraine 

During the 2022 Russian invasion of Ukraine, the village came under Russian occupation. It was recaptured by Ukrainian forces on May 3, 2022.

Gallery

References 

Villages in Chuhuiv Raion
Webarchive template wayback links
Commons category link is on Wikidata